Łukasz Kolenda is a Polish professional basketball player for Śląsk Wrocław of the PLK. Standing at 1.96 m, he plays Point guard position.

Club career
Łukasz Kolenda joined Trefl Sopot in 2012. 

In the 2020–21 PLK season, his team finished 5th and exceeded expectations. The quarter-finals series against Śląsk Wrocław was Kolenda's first playoff experience. Yet, he was not able to prevent his team from falling 1-3 overall. For the series, Kolenda praised the defense tactics of the opponent's head coach Oliver Vidin.

In April 2021, Łukasz Kolenda's contract with Trefl Sopot expired.

On July 9, 2021, he has signed with Śląsk Wrocław of the PLK.

National team
Kolenda has been a member of the Polish national team.

References

External links
Profile at league website
Profile at Eurobasket.com
Proballers profile

1999 births
Living people
People from Ełk
Point guards
Polish men's basketball players
Śląsk Wrocław basketball players
Trefl Sopot players